Eugénio Katombi (born 10 March 1958) is an Angolan middle-distance runner. He competed in the men's 1500 metres at the 1988 Summer Olympics.

References

External links
 

1958 births
Living people
Athletes (track and field) at the 1988 Summer Olympics
Angolan male middle-distance runners
Olympic athletes of Angola
Place of birth missing (living people)